Macklin Celebrini (born June 13, 2006) is a Canadian junior ice hockey forward for the Chicago Steel of the USHL. Celebrini will be eligible for the 2024 NHL Entry Draft and is projected, along with Aron Kiviharju, as most likely to be chosen first overall.

Playing career
Celebrini signed with the Chicago Steel for the 2022-2023 season after scoring 50 goals and 67 assists in 52 games playing for the Shattuck-Saint Mary's. He quickly earned a hat trick and was named USHL's forward of the week.

Celebrini is committed to play for Boston University.

References

External links
 

2006 births
Living people
Ice hockey people from British Columbia
Canadian ice hockey forwards
Canadian expatriate ice hockey players in the United States
21st-century Canadian people